The following is a sortable table of all songs by A Day to Remember:

The column Song list the song title.
The column Writer(s) lists who wrote the song.
The column Album lists the album the song is featured on.
The column Producer lists the producer of the song.
The column Year lists the year in which the song was released.
The column Length list the length/duration of the song.

Studio recordings

Live recordings

References
 Footnotes
Re-recorded for release on Old Record (2008).
Re-recordings for the reissue of For Those Who Have Heart (2007).
Later included on Attack of the Killer B-Sides (2010) EP.
Recorded during the Homesick (2009) sessions.
Performed live on BBC Radio's Rock Show on March 8, 2011.
Released on the Record Store Day release of "All I Want" on 7" vinyl.
Samples of these tracks were put on the website for The Wade Studios.
Bonus tracks released on the physical edition of Common Courtesy.

 Citations

 
Day to Remember